David John Bryant  (27 October 1931 – 27 August 2020) was a three-times World (outdoors) singles bowls champion (in 1966, 1980 and 1988), a three-times World indoors singles champion (in 1979, 1980 and 1981) and a four times Commonwealth Games singles gold medallist. He is generally considered to be the greatest bowler of all time, winning 19 World and Commonwealth gold medals in total.

The beginning
Born into a bowling dynasty, his grandfather was a founder member of the Clevedon Bowling Club in Chapel Hill, Clevedon, North Somerset. His father, Reginald Bryant, won three national fours rinks titles. David joined the club when he was 16 and during his first season with the club he won the Clevedon Bowls handicap.

Bowls career

World Outdoor Championships
He won the inaugural World Outdoor singles title at Kyeemagh in 1966 and went on to win five gold medals (three singles, one triples and one team). He won eleven medals in total (three more silver and three more bronze), from 1966 until 1988.

Commonwealth Games
Bryant claimed a double gold medal at the 1962 British Empire and Commonwealth Games in Perth in both the singles and fours. This was the catalyst for four singles gold medals and five gold Commonwealth Games gold medals in total. The singles golds were in 1962, 1970, 1974 and 1978.  No bowls competition was held at the 1966 Commonwealth Games which arguably stopped Bryant from winning a fifth.

World Indoor Championships
Bryant also reached legendary status indoors after winning nine World Championships, three in singles and six in the pairs with Tony Allcock.

National
Bryant also helped his county win the Middleton Cup on numerous occasions, where among his Somerset teammates was former Scottish League international footballer Bobby Black.

In addition to the Middleton Cup victories he was crowned National Champion on 16 occasions for Somerset.
Singles - 1960, 1966, 1971, 1972, 1973, 1975
Pairs - 1965, 1969, 1970 
Triples - 1966, 1977, 1985
Fours - 1957, 1968, 1969, 1971

Awards
In the 1969 New Year Honours, Bryant was appointed a Member of the Order of the British Empire (MBE) for services to bowls. He was promoted to Commander of the Order of the British Empire (CBE) in the 1980 Birthday Honours, again for services to bowls.

Personal life
Bryant was born in Clevedon, North Somerset, on 27 October 1931 and died on 27 August 2020, aged 88. He was famous for smoking a tobacco pipe whilst playing, and in 1986 was honoured with the award for Pipe Smoker of the Year. His father Reginald Bryant won three National fours/rinks titles.

Bibliography
Bryant wrote many books on the subject of bowls, including:

Bryant on Bowls — Outdoor & Indoor 1966  
Bowl with Bryant 1984 
The Game of Bowls (co-authored with David Rhys Jones) 1990 
Bowl to Win (co-authored with Tony Allcock) 1994

See also 
 List of Bowls England champions

References

External links 
 David Bryant on the Somerset Bowls Association website

English male bowls players
English people of Welsh descent
People from Clevedon
1931 births
2020 deaths
Commonwealth Games gold medallists for England
Bowls players at the 1962 British Empire and Commonwealth Games
Bowls players at the 1970 British Commonwealth Games
Bowls players at the 1974 British Commonwealth Games
Bowls players at the 1978 Commonwealth Games
Commanders of the Order of the British Empire
Bowls World Champions
Commonwealth Games medallists in lawn bowls
Indoor Bowls World Champions
Medallists at the 1962 British Empire and Commonwealth Games
Medallists at the 1970 British Commonwealth Games
Medallists at the 1974 British Commonwealth Games
Medallists at the 1978 Commonwealth Games